Nicholas Jameson (born December 5, 1950) is an American actor, musician and producer, perhaps best known for his portrayal of Russian president Yuri Suvarov over three seasons on the show 24. He currently resides in Reykjavík doing live comedy, live music entertainment and remote voice-over work.

Early life
Jameson was born in Columbia, Missouri, to Michael H. Jameson, a classicist, and Virginia Broyles, a teacher and a scholar, and was raised primarily in Philadelphia. Prior to settling in Philadelphia, however, Jameson moved with his family to various places around Europe, which exposed him to a variety of the accents that inspired his approach to many of the characters that he plays and/or voices.

Career
He has appeared in the television series Mission Hill, The Critic, 24, Lost, The King of Queens and, vocally, in Star Wars: Clone Wars as Palpatine, Darts D'Nar in Star Wars: The Clone Wars, the radio adaptation of Dark Empire, and several other productions of Star Wars. He has over 114 film credits. He has also voiced in Spider-Man: The Animated Series as Richard Fisk and Morbius, and provided the voice of Max and Agent/Coach Morceau Oleander in the video games Sam & Max Hit the Road and Psychonauts respectfully. He also voiced Lloyd in Arc the Lad: Twilight of the Spirits. In 2006, his voice was featured in the video game Metal Gear Solid: Portable Ops as Colonel Skowronski. He voiced Jim Dear in Lady and the Tramp II: Scamp's Adventure. He also voiced as Aldar Beedo in the video game Star Wars: Episode I Racer. In 2012, he voiced the character Toxic Reapa from the miniseries Hero Factory. He voices Marshall Dune in the point-and-click adventure Broken Age.

Nick has also had a relatively lengthy career in music.  Early on, he was a member of The American Dream (1970), a Philadelphia band whose debut album was Todd Rundgren's first production credit. More prominent success soon followed when he briefly became the unofficial fourth member of the British blues-rock band Foghat, producing several of their albums as well, including  Fool for the City, which spawned the band's biggest hit "Slow Ride." Nick's bass-playing is prominently featured on this track as well as the rest of the album. One of the tracks on the "Fool For The City" album, a cover of the Muddy Waters song "My Babe", was a song that Nick had originally recorded with The American Dream in 1970. He has also released a couple of solo albums: Already Free and A Crowd of One , the latter of which featured the single "Weatherman," which cracked the Billboard Hot 100. The track has a breezy pop-rock feel that was fairly typical of the mid-'80s. It is somewhat similar in terms of both melody and tempo to Mr. Mister's big hit, "Kyrie," albeit with much lighter percussion. A year later, Jack Wagner recorded a cover version of the tune (under the title "Weatherman Says").  Another track from the A Crowd of One album, "Love's Closing In" was also featured on the soundtrack to the 1986 film, A Fine Mess.

Although an American native, Jameson has become very well known for his ability to perform in a variety of deceptively authentic accents, particularly British English and Australian.

In 2014, after living in Los Angeles for years, Jameson moved to Reykjavík.

Filmography

Animation film

Animation Television

Live-Action Film

Live-Action Television

Video Games

Discography

Studio albums
 Already Free (1977)
 A Crowd of One (1986)

with The American Dream
 The American Dream (1970)

with Paul Butterfield
 Paul Butterfield's Better Days – It All Comes Back (1973) (producer only)
Put it in Your Ear (1976)

with Tim Moore
 Tim Moore (1974)
 Behind the Eyes (1975) (producer only)

with Foghat
 Rock and Roll Outlaws (1974) (producer only)
 Fool for the City (1975)

References

External links 

Promotional photograph of Nick for his Warner Bros. album "Already Free."
http://dfki.de/~jameson/mhj/memorial-service/mhj-memorial-service.html#nick-jameson (Nick delivers the "Family Remembrance" part, which includes some biographical info)

Official Website

Living people
Actors from Columbia, Missouri
American male bass guitarists
American multi-instrumentalists
American rock bass guitarists
American rock singers
American male television actors
American male video game actors
American male voice actors
Bearsville Records artists
Guitarists from Columbia, Missouri
Musicians from Philadelphia
Record producers from Pennsylvania
Singers from Columbia, Missouri
Songwriters from Missouri
20th-century American bass guitarists
20th-century American male musicians
American male songwriters
1950 births